Ctenothrissiformes is an extinct order of prehistoric ray-finned fish.

Timeline of genera

Taxonomy
 Order Ctenothrissiformes Berg 1937
 Family †Aulolepidae Patterson 1964
 Genus †Aulolepis Agassiz 1836 non Geinitz 1849
 †A. reussi Geinitz 1849
 †A. typa Agassiz 1844
 Genus †Cyclolepis Geinitz 1868 non Gillies ex Don 1832 non Moquin-Tandon 1834
 †C. agassizi Geinitz 1868
 †C. stenodina Cockerell 1919
 Family †Ctenothrissidae Woodward 1901
 Genus †Heterothrissa Gaudant 1978
 †Heterothrissa signeuxae Gaudant 1978
 Genus †Ctenothrissa Woodward 1899
 †C. enigmatica Gaudant 1978
 †C. microcephala (Agassiz 1835-1838) [Beryx microcephalus Agassiz 1835-1838]
 †C. protodorsalis Gaudant 1978
 †C. radians (Agassiz 1835-1838) [Beryx radians Agassiz 1835-1838]
 †C. signifer Hay 1903
 †C. vexillifer (Pictet 1850) [Beryx vexillifer Pictet 1850]

References

 

 
Prehistoric ray-finned fish orders